Eremopola is a genus of moths of the family Noctuidae, first described by William Warren in 1911. The type species is Eremopola lenis (Staudinger, 1891).

Species
 Eremopola faroulti (Rothschild, 1920)
 Eremopola grammoscelis Rothschild
 Eremopola lenis (Staudinger, 1891)
 Eremopola magnifica Rothschild, 1914
 Eremopola marmarides Turati, 1924
 Eremopola orana (Lucas, 1849)
 Eremopola oranoides (Boursin, 1953)
 Eremopola radoti Boursin, 1934

References

Cuculliinae